The church of Sant'Ireneo a Centocelle is a church in Rome, in the Prenestino district, in Via dei Castani.

History
Built in the twentieth century and designed by Antonio Guidi, the church is the home of the parish, established July 17, 1954 by decree of the Cardinal Vicar Clemente Micara "Here celeritate".

Since February 14, 2015, is the seat of  the cardinal title of S. Irenæ ad Cetumcellas.

List of Cardinal Protectors
 Charles Maung Bo 14 February 2015 - present

References

External links
 Sant'Ireneo 

Titular churches
Rome Q. VII Prenestino-Labicano